Ubaena is a genus of moths in the family Saturniidae first described by Ferdinand Karsch in 1900.

Species
Ubaena dolabella (Druce, 1886)
Ubaena fuelleborniana Karsch, 1900
Ubaena lequeuxi Darge & Terral, 1988
Ubaena periculosa Darge & Terral, 1988
Ubaena sabunii Darge & Kilumile, 2004

References

Saturniinae